Madame Guillotine (Italian:Madame Tallien) is a 1916 Italian historical film directed by Mario Caserini and Enrico Guazzoni and starring Lyda Borelli, Renzo Fabiani and Amleto Novelli. It is based on a play by Victorien Sardou set during the French Revolution.

Cast
 Lyda Borelli as Madame Tallien
 Renzo Fabiani as Robespierre
 Amleto Novelli as Tallien
 Ettore Baccani as Fontenay
 Ruggero Barni as Guery
 Orlando Ricci 
 Roberto Spiombi

References

Bibliography
 Redi, Riccardo. Cinema muto italiano: 1896-1930. Fondazione Scuola nazionale di cinema, 1999.

External links 
 

1916 films
1910s historical films
Italian historical films
Italian silent feature films
1910s Italian-language films
Films based on works by Victorien Sardou
Films set in France
Films set in the 18th century
Films directed by Enrico Guazzoni
Films directed by Mario Caserini
French Revolution films
Cultural depictions of Maximilien Robespierre
Italian black-and-white films